Quang Vinh is a ward located in Biên Hòa city of Đồng Nai province, Vietnam. It has an area of about 1.2km2 and the population in 2017 was 18,461.

Ancient Citadel of Biên Hòa located in Quang Vinh ward is the only ancient citadel in the Southern Vietnam that still exists today.

References

Bien Hoa